Cercosaura bassleri, known commonly as the ocellated tegu, is a species of lizard in the family Gymnophthalmidae. The species is endemic to Peru.

Etymology
The specific name, bassleri, is in honor of Dr. Harvey Bassler of the American Museum of Natural History.

Geographic range
Cercosaura bassleri is found on the eastern slopes of the Andes, in Perené District, Chanchamayo Province, Department of Junín, Peru.

References

Further reading
Ruibal, Rodolfo (1952). "Revisionary Studies of Some South American Teiidae". Bulletin of the Museum of Comparative Zoölogy at Harvard College, in Cambridge [Massachusetts] 106: 475–529. (Cercosaura ocellata bassleri, new subspecies, pp. 499-500 + Figure 3 on p. 526).
Sturaro, Marcelo José; Rodrigues, Miguel T.; Colli, Guarino R.; Knowles, L. Lacey; Avila-Pires, Teresa C.S. (2018). "Integrative taxonomy of the lizards Cercosaura ocellata species complex (Reptilia: Gymnophthalmidae)". Zoologischer Anzeiger 275: 37–65.
Torres-Carvajal, Omar; Lobos, Simón E.; Venegas, Pablo J. (2015). "Phylogeny of Neotropical Cercosaura (Squamata: Gymnophthalmidae) lizards". Molecular Phylogenetics and Evolution 93: 281–288. (Cercosaura bassleri, new status).

Cercosaura
Reptiles of Peru
Endemic fauna of Peru
Reptiles described in 1952
Taxa named by Rodolfo Ruibal